Aznab-e Sofla (also Romanized as Aznāb-e Soflā) is a village in Chahardangeh Rural District, Hurand District, Ahar County, East Azerbaijan Province, Iran. At the 2006 census, its population count was 395 persons in 85 families.

References 

Populated places in Ahar County